The 2001–02 Serie A (known as the Serie A TIM for sponsorship reasons) was the 100th season of top-tier Italian football, the 70th in a round-robin tournament. It was composed by 18 teams, for the 14th consecutive time from season 1988–89.

The first two teams qualified directly to the UEFA Champions League, teams ending in the third and fourth places had to play Champions League qualifications, teams ending in the fifth and sixth places qualified for the UEFA Cup (another spot was given to the winner of Coppa Italia), while the last four teams were to be relegated to Serie B. However, Fiorentina's subsequent bankruptcy led to them being placed in the fourth tier of Italian football.

Juventus won its 26th title on the final day of the season after original leaders Internazionale (who finished third) lost 4–2 away to Lazio, and with it their chance at winning their first Scudetto since 1989. Second place went to Roma.

This season also featured Chievo's "miracle". The club, newly promoted to Serie A for the first time, were top of the table for six weeks early in the season. However, after the Christmas break, they hit some bad form and finished the season in fifth place.

Eighteen teams competed in the league, with four promoted teams from Serie B, Torino, Piacenza, Chievo and Venezia, replacing the four relegated teams from the 2000–01 Serie A season, Reggina, Vicenza, Napoli and Bari.

Personnel and sponsoring

 Promoted from Serie B.

Managerial changes

League table

Results

Overall
Most wins – Juventus and Internazionale (20)
Fewest wins – Venezia (3)
Most draws – Roma, Milan, Torino and Brescia (13)
Fewest draws – Hellas Verona (6)
Most losses – Fiorentina and Venezia (22)
Fewest losses – Roma (2)
Most goals scored – Juventus (64)
Fewest goals scored – Fiorentina (29)
Most goals conceded – Fiorentina (63)
Fewest goals conceded – Juventus (23)

Top goalscorers

Number of teams by region

References

Almanacco Illustrato del Calcio – La Storia 1898-2004, Panini Edizioni, Modena, September 2005

External links
 :it:Classifica calcio Serie A italiana 2002 – Italian version with pictures and info.
  – All results on RSSSF Website.
 2001/2002 Serie A Squads – (www.footballsquads.com)

Serie A seasons
Italy
1